The 2017 UK & Ireland Greyhound Racing Year was the 92nd year of greyhound racing in the United Kingdom and Ireland.

Summary

Wimbledon and Hall Green
The year was best known for the closure of the GRA operated tracks of Wimbledon Stadium and Hall Green Stadium. Wimbledon closed on 25 March. Wimbledon's sister track Hall Green, owned by Euro Property Investments Ltd, closed on 29 July and will be demolished.

Towcester Derby
The premier competition of the year, the English Greyhound Derby, was held at Towcester on 1 July, the first time in the competition's history that it was held outside of London. It was won by 28-1 shot Astute Missile; the outsider of the six in the final.

Irish protests
In Ireland continuing protests by the DGOBA resulted in a suspension of racing at Shelbourne Park for five months and the cancellation of several major events. The protest was over the February closure of Harold's Cross Stadium. The Irish Derby held in September was won by the Patrick Guilfoyle trained Good News.

Streaming Rights & Bookmakers
The industry experienced a battle for broadcasting and streaming rights between Satellite Information Services (SIS) and the Arena Racing Company (ARC). Each signed up various tracks to enable them to produce fixtures for the bookmaking chains, the latter ARC even bought two tracks (Sunderland and Newcastle) from William Hill in May. Ladbrokes and Gala Coral merged to become Ladbrokes Coral.

Other News
One of the sports leading events, the Laurels, switched from the GRA and Belle Vue to Newcastle. The move was seen as positive with high hopes that the race could regain some of its former glory and increase its prize fund. Mark Wallis extended his champion trainer trophy record to nine.

Roll of honour

Principal UK finals

 Jumeirah Lolls disqualified from competing after positive sample

Principal Irish finals

UK Category 1 & 2 competitions

+ held in 2018

Irish feature competitions

References 

Greyhound racing in the United Kingdom
Greyhound racing in the Republic of Ireland
Greyhound Racing Year
Greyhound Racing Year
UK and Ireland